Scirocco was one of four s built for the  (Royal Italian Navy) in the early 1930s. Completed in 1934, she served in World War II.

Design and description
The Maestrale-class destroyers were a completely new design intended to rectify the stability problems of the preceding . Their complement during wartime was 190 officers and enlisted men.

The Maestrales were powered by two Parsons geared steam turbines, each driving one propeller shaft using steam supplied by a trio of three-drum boilers.

Their main battery consisted of four  guns in two twin-gun turrets, one each fore and aft of the superstructure. Amidships were a pair of 15-caliber 120-millimeter star shell guns. Anti-aircraft (AA) defense for the Maestrale-class ships was provided by four  machine guns. They were equipped with six  torpedo tubes in two triple mounts amidships. Although the ships were not provided with a sonar system for anti-submarine work, they were fitted with a pair of depth charge throwers. The Maestrales could carry 56 mines.

Citations

Bibliography

External links
 Scirocco Marina Militare website

Maestrale-class destroyers
1934 ships
World War II destroyers of Italy
Maritime incidents in September 1943